Thyavanige  is a village in the southern state of Karnataka, India. It is located in the Channagiri taluk of Davanagere district.

Demographics
 India census, Thyavanige had a population of 5382 with 2792 males and 2590 females.

See also
 Davanagere
 Districts of Karnataka

References

External links
 http://Davanagere.nic.in/

Villages in Davanagere district